The brachialis (brachialis anticus), also known as the Teichmann muscle, is a muscle in the upper arm that flexes the elbow. It lies beneath the biceps brachii, and makes up part of the floor of the region known as the cubital fossa (elbow pit). It originates from the anterior aspect of the distal humerus; it inserts onto the tuberosity of the ulna. It is innervated by the musculocutaneous nerve, and commonly also receives additional innervation from the radial nerve. The brachialis is the prime mover of elbow flexion generating about 50% more power than the biceps.

Structure

Origin 
The brachialis originates from the anterior surface of the distal half of the humerus, near the insertion of the deltoid muscle, which it embraces by two angular processes. Its origin extends below to within 2.5 cm of the margin of the articular surface of the humerus at the elbow joint.

Insertion 
Its fibers converge to a thick tendon which is inserted into the tuberosity of the ulna, and the rough depression on the anterior surface of the coronoid process of the ulna.

Innervation
The brachialis muscle is innervated by the musculocutaneous nerve, which runs on its superficial surface, between it and the biceps brachii. However, in 70-80% of people, the muscle has double innervation with the radial nerve (C5-T1). The divide between the two innervations is at the insertion of the deltoid.

Blood supply
The brachialis is supplied by muscular branches of the brachial artery and by the recurrent radial artery.

Variation
The muscle is occasionally doubled; additional muscle slips to the supinator, pronator teres, biceps brachii, lacertus fibrosus, or radius are more rarely found.

Function
The brachialis flexes the arm at the elbow joint. Unlike the biceps, the brachialis does not insert on the radius, and does not participate in pronation and supination of the forearm.

History

Etymology
The brachialis muscle In classical Latin bracchialis means of or belonging to the arm, and is derived from classical Latin bracchium,"arm". The expression musculus brachialis is used in the current official anatomic nomenco Terminologia Anatomica''.

Additional images

See also

References

External links

 

Elbow flexors
Muscles of the upper limb